The Quebec Avalanche was a National Women's Hockey League team (2002 to 2007) located in Laval, Quebec, Canada. Before they were previously known as Sainte-Julie Pantheres  (1999–2001) and Metropol Le Cheyenne (2001–2003). Quebec Avalanche has also a children's development program for hockey in Montreal.

History

Season-by-season 

Note: GP = Games played, W = Wins, L = Losses, T = Ties, GF = Goals for, GA = Goals against, Pts = Points.

Season standings

NWHL Championships

1999-2000: Sainte-Julie Pantheres defeated  Laval Le Mistral and Montreal Axion in the  first round of playoffs, and faced the Beatrice Aeros for the finals in Brampton, Ontario. In the first game of the Final playoff, the Pantheres came back and tied the game 2-2. In the deciding game, Beatrice Aeros player Cherie Piper scored in the first period. That would prove to be the game-winning goal as Beatrice Aeros claimed the championship by a 1-0 score. Lauren Goldstein earned the shutout for the Aeros. Goaltender Marie-Claude Roy of the Sainte-Julie Pantheres was selected MVP for the Finals. She stopped 80 of 83 shots in the two game series.

March 18: Ste. Julie 2, Beatrice 2
March 19: Beatrice 1, Ste. Julie 0
Beatrice Aeros wins title based on most goals scored. 
1999/2000 Coach of Eastern Division All Star Team : Sébastien Gariépy, Ste-Julie Pantheres

2000-01: Beatrice Aeros Capture Second NWHL Title: Beatrice wins title based on most goals scored
March 18, 2001: Ste. Julie 2, Beatrice 2
March 19: Beatrice 8, Ste. Julie 1

Last roster 2006–07

Notables former players
 Emilie Castonguay Forward
 Nancy Drolet, Forward
 Caroline Laforge Forward
 Kim St-Pierre, Goalie
 Genevieve St-Pierre Goalie

Former coaches
 Head Coach: Christian Lefebvre ( Sébastien Gariépy in season 1999-2000 for Sainte-Julie Pantheres)
 Goaltending Coach: Marco Marciano

See also
 National Women's Hockey League (1999–2007) (NWHL)

References

External links
 Quebec Avalanche Hockey Club
 NWHL website

Women's ice hockey teams in Canada
Ice hockey teams in Quebec
Defunct ice hockey teams in Canada
National Women's Hockey League (1999–2007) teams
Sport in Laval, Quebec
2002 establishments in Quebec
Ice hockey clubs established in 2002
Ice hockey clubs disestablished in 2017
2007 disestablishments in Quebec
Women in Quebec